Jiffy Lube International, Inc. is an American chain of automotive oil change specialty shops founded in Utah, United States, in 1971. It has been a subsidiary of Shell since 2002, and is headquartered in Houston, Texas.

Overview 

There are about 2,000 Jiffy Lube franchises in North America, all of them independently owned by 252 operators, with about 24 million customers each year as of 2002. The company was ranked first on National Oil and Lube News 2011 Tops in the Fast Lubes Industry Rankings. Also, Jiffy Lube was ranked number 15 in Entrepreneur Magazines 2012 Franchise 500 and number 73 on Franchise Times 2011 Top 200 Franchise Chains by Worldwide Sales.

History 
The first Jiffy Lube store was established on 36th Street in Ogden, Utah by Edwin H. Washburn as early as 1971. Over the following years, Washburn franchised a number of Jiffy Lube stores within Utah. In 1979, W. James Hindman, a football coach at Western Maryland College, bought out Washburn's seven franchises and established Jiffy Lube International, relocating the headquarters to Baltimore, Maryland. It is this year which Jiffy Lube generally states as its founding date with Hindman as its founder.

Jiffy Lube went public in 1987, and had opened over 1,019 franchises and company stores by 1989. In 1991, Jiffy Lube became a subsidiary of Pennzoil.

Following the merger of Pennzoil and Quaker State in 1998, the 581 Q Lube stores were merged into the Jiffy Lube brand, then possessing 1,541 stores, with overlapping operations being closed down. Pennzoil-Quaker State was ultimately purchased by Shell Oil Company in 2002.

Services 
In June 2011, Jiffy Lube introduced a new program called Oil Change Schedule (OCS). The new program allows Jiffy Lube customers to choose how often they have their oil changed based on a number of variables including vehicle manufacturer recommendations, driving habits, and road conditions. The OCS program moves away from the old model of changing oil every 3,000 miles and provides a schedule that is unique for each driver.

Controversy 
In 2003, Jiffy Lube was the focus of a KNBC investigative report that alleged that Jiffy Lube was charging customers for services not performed. During the investigation, five out of nine Jiffy Lube locations charged undercover reporters for work that was not performed. After the investigation aired, Jiffy Lube claimed to perform sweeping changes to their training program to prevent this, though among the training tactics, was having workers recognize the tactics of an investigative reporter and evade further scrutiny. At the end of the investigation, Jiffy Lube installed cameras in their stores to allow customers to observe repairs.

In 2009, Jiffy Lube was found to be performing repair procedures on vehicles that were recommended against by the manufacturer due to the potential to cause engine damage. These procedures included engine flushes and fuel injection cleaning which can cause engine and fuel injection problems.

In May 2013, Los Angeles Jiffy Lube locations were again the subject of a KNBC investigation. The station reported that not only had fraudulent practices again been detected at the majority of investigated Southern California Jiffy Lube stores, but the current fraud was worse than that found in the original investigation.

References

External links 

 

Shell plc brands
American companies established in 1971
Retail companies established in 1971
Automotive repair shops of the United States
Companies based in Houston
1971 establishments in Utah
American brands